Park Am (born November 11, 1924 – March 22, 1989) was a South Korean actor. Park was born in Seoul in 1924. He graduated from the college of Dentistry at Seoul National University.

Filmography
*Note; the whole list is referenced.
'

Awards
 1973 the 12th Grand Bell Awards: Best Supporting Actor for (열궁녀)
 1980 the 19th Grand Bell Awards: Best Supporting Actor for (땅울림)

References

External links

1924 births
1989 deaths
Seoul National University alumni
20th-century South Korean male actors
South Korean male film actors
South Korean male television actors
Male actors from Seoul